George Alexandru Neagu (born 24 April 1985) is a Romanian retired professional footballer who played as a defender.

Honours

Club
ACS Poli Timișoara
Liga II: 2014–15

Gaz Metan Mediaș
Liga II: 2015–16

References

External links
 
 

1985 births
Living people
People from Orăștie
Romanian footballers
Association football defenders
Liga I players
Liga II players
CS Minerul Lupeni players
FC Progresul București players
CS Mioveni players
FC Internațional Curtea de Argeș players
FC UTA Arad players
CS Pandurii Târgu Jiu players
ACS Poli Timișoara players
CS Gaz Metan Mediaș players